Jason Nazary (born January 24, 1984) is an American jazz and improvisational musician (drums and electronics). He was born in Aviano, Italy, while his father was in the US military, and grew up in the Atlanta, Georgia area.  In 2002, he played in Betty Carter's Jazz Ahead concerts at the Kennedy Center in Washington, DC. He moved to New York City in 2005, and, as of 2019, he is based in Brooklyn, New York.

Discography 

Solo as So Ghost
 2018: Companion II (Jass)
 2019: Boss a Nova (Jass)

Solo
 2021: Spring Collection (We Jazz Records)

 With Little Women (Darius Jones, Jason Nazary)
 2007: Teeth (Gilgongo Records), with Ben Greenberg
 2010: Throat (AUM Fidelity), with Andrew Smiley
 2013: Lung (AUM Fidelity), with Andrew Smiley

 With  and Joe Morris
 2008: Fine Objects

 With Darius Jones Trio
 2009: Man'ish Boy (A Raw & Beautiful Thing) (AUM Fidelity)
 2011: Big Gurl (Smell My Dream) (AUM Fidelity)

 With Noah Kaplan Quartet
 2011: Descendants (hatOLOGY)
 2017: Cluster Swerve (hatOLOGY)

 With Chris Pitsiokos Quartet
 2016: One Eye With A Microscope Attached (Eleatic Records)

 With Terrie Ex (Hessels) and 
 2018: Live at Space is the Place

With Eli Wallace
 2018: Slideshoe Junky I (Iluso)

With Clebs (Jason Nazary, Emilie Weibel)
 2018: I'm Here (Jass)
 2019: Fault Sequence (Thanksgiving Dump) (self released)

With Anteloper (Jaimie Branch, Jason Nazary)
 2018: Kudu (International Anthem Recording Co.)
 2020: Tour Beats Vol. 1 (International Anthem Recording Co.)

With Bloor
 2019: Drolleries (Astral Spirits)

With Dim Thickets
 2019: s/t (Anticausal Systems)

References

External links 
 

American jazz drummers
American electronic musicians
1984 births
Living people